John M. Hollway (1841 – 1907) was an English metallurgist and chemist who, in the 1870s, unsuccessfully tried out smelting and refining of copper using a converter based on the Bessemer process.

Notes

1841 births
1907 deaths
British metallurgists
People of the Industrial Revolution